Wan Chai (born January 24, 1972) is a retired Burmese Lethwei fighter and former Openweight Lethwei World Champion in 1998 and 1999.

Early life 
Wan Chai was born in 1972 to father U Pan Nyunt and mother Daw Khin May in Kawt Nwe, a village east of Kawkareik city in Kayin State. He started his training initially with Myawaddy U Than Shwe, a former boxer well known with the arts in both Myanmar and Thailand himself.

Lethwei career 
Before his fame in Myanmar lethwei Wan Chai was already a veteran of the fight game with great experiences gained in Thailand. After returning to Myanmar he burst onto the scene grabbing the inaugural openweight Golden Belt by defeating Aung Aung Tun. In 1998 he aimed for the crown and Shwe Du Wun's reign came to a halt under the coersive script of fate. Wan Chai took the National title away from the champion within three rounds in one of their rematches.

After his retirement Wan Chai made a commitment to support the Aung Myanmar lethwei club in 2016, which trained Daung Thi Chay, Lwann Chai, Saw George, Yan Linn Aung and Daung Phyu Lay at the time. He transferred to several clubs but eventually ended up with the one carrying his own name. His most notable students are his son Lwann Chai and Thway Thit Win Hlaing.

Myanmar vs USA challenge 
In June 2001, Wan Chai was matched with American UFC veteran Doug Evans at the "International Myanmar traditional boxing challenge & Myanmar-Australia talent testing boxing competition" in Yangon, Myanmar. In he first round, Evans was dropped to the floor with a knee strike to the lower abdomen while clinching and lost by referee stoppage (TKO). Evans later claimed he was kneed in the groin by Wan Chai, however the official did not see the strike and the referee stoppage remained.

Titles and accomplishments 
 Championships
 Myanmar National Champion (1998, 1999)
 Golden Belt Champion (1996)
 Other championships
 2001 challenge fight belt holder

Lethwei record 

|- style="background:#c5d2ea;"
| 2012-01-08 || Draw || align="left" | Shwe War Tun || Dagon Shwe Aung Lan 2012 || Yangon, Myanmar || Draw || 3 || 3:00
|- style="background:#c5d2ea;"
| 2009-04-04 || Draw || align="left" | Zarni Sin Yine || Dagon Shwe Aung Lan 2009 || Yangon, Myanmar || Draw || 3 || 3:00
|- style="background:#c5d2ea;"
| 2009-02-06 || Draw || align="left" | Shwe War Tun || Myaw Sin Island Challenge Fights || Yangon, Myanmar || Draw || 3 || 3:00
|- style="background:#c5d2ea;"
| 2009-00-00 || Draw || align="left" | Saw Thae Aung || Lethwei Challenge Fights || Myanmar || Draw || 5 || 3:00
|- style="background:#fbb;"
| 2006-01-26 || Loss || align="left" | Lone Chaw || Myeik city Lethwei Challenge Fights || Myeik, Myanmar || TKO || 3 ||
|- style="background:#c5d2ea;"
| 2005-04-03 || Draw || align="left" | Lone Chaw|| City F.M Aung Lan Tournament, Myanmar Convention Center || Yangon, Myanmar || Draw || 5 || 3:00
|- style="background:#fbb;"
| 2004-06-13 || Loss || align="left" | Shwe Sai|| Challenge Fights, Thuwunna Gymnasium || Yangon, Myanmar || TKO || 3 || 2:52
|- style="background:#cfc;"
| 2004-06-05 || Win || align="left" | Lone Chaw || Myeik city Lethwei Challenge Fights || Myeik, Myanmar || KO || 3 || 2:50
|- style="background:#c5d2ea;"
| 2003-06-01 || Draw || align="left" | Shan Lay Thway || Challenge Fights, Thuwunna Gymnasium || Yangon, Myanmar || Draw || 5 || 3:00
|- style="background:#cfc;"
| 2001-06-09 || Win || align="left" | Doug Evans|| International Challenge Fights, Thuwunna NIS(1) || Yangon, Myanmar || TKO || 1 ||
|-
! style=background:white colspan=9 |
|- style="background:#c5d2ea;"
| 2001-04-30 || Draw || align="left" | Shan Lay Thway || Challenge Fights, Ba Htoo Football field || Mandalay, Myanmar || Draw || 5 || 3:00
|- style="background:#fbb;"
| 1999-00-00 || Loss || align="left" | Shan Lay Thway || Champions Challenge, Thuwunna Gymnasium || Yangon, Myanmar || TKO || 1 ||
|-
! style=background:white colspan=9 |
|- style="background:#cfc;"
| 1998-00-00 || Win || align="left" | Win Naing Tun || Challenge Fights, Ba Htoo Football field || Mandalay, Myanmar || KO || 2 || 
|- style="background:#cfc;"
| 1998-00-00 || Win || align="left" | Shwe Du Wun || Hpayarkone village Challenge Fights || Hpa-an Township, Myanmar || KO ||  || 
|- style="background:#cfc;"
| 1998-04-01 || Win || align="left" | Shwe Du Wun|| 51st Mon National Day, Aung San Indoor Stadium || Yangon, Myanmar || KO || 3 || 1:04
|-
! style=background:white colspan=9 |
|- style="background:#c5d2ea;"
| 1997-11-06 || Draw || align="left" | Shwe Du Wun || Challenge Fights, Ba Htoo Football field || Mandalay, Myanmar || Draw || 5 || 3:00
|- style="background:#c5d2ea;"
| 1997-07-09 || Draw || align="left" | Shwe Du Wun || Challenge Fights, Ba Htoo Football field || Mandalay, Myanmar || Draw || 12 || 3:00
|- style="background:#c5d2ea;"
| 1997-05-05 || Draw || align="left" | Aung Aung Tun || (52nd) Armed Forces Day Challenge Fights, Ba Htoo Football field || Mandalay, Myanmar || Draw || 7 || 3:00
|- style="background:#cfc;"
| 1997-00-00 || Win || align="left" | Moe Palae || Lethwei Challenge Fights || Hpa-an Township, Myanmar || KO || 6 || 
|- style="background:#cfc;"
| 1997-02-25 || Win || align="left" | Shwe War Tun || Kawt Gun village Challenge Fights || Hlaingbwe Township, Myanmar || KO || 4 || 
|- style="background:#cfc;"
| 1997-02-03 || Win || align="left" | (Thar Si) Maung Maung Gyi || Lethwei Challenge Fights, Aung San Indoor Stadium || Yangon, Myanmar || KO || 4 || 
|- style="background:#cfc;"
| 1997-02-02 || Win || align="left" | Aung Aung Tun || Golden Belt Championship, Aung San Indoor Stadium|| Yangon, Myanmar || KO || 4 || 
|-
! style=background:white colspan=9 |
|- style="background:#cfc;"
| 1997-01-09 || Win || align="left" | Kittichai Kiatbusaba || International Challenge Fights || Chiang Mai, Thailand || TKO || 4 || 
|- style="background:#fbb;"
| 1995-00-00 || Loss || align="left" | Somdang Nongkhai || International Challenge Fights || Thailand || TKO ||  ||
|- style="background:#c5d2ea;"
| 1995-00-00 || Draw || align="left" | Kolalek Lookphrayapichai || Burma-Thai Challenge Fights || Thailand || Draw || 5 ||
|-

References

External links

Living people
1972 births
Burmese people of Karen descent
Burmese Lethwei practitioners
People from Kayin State